General Sir Alan Gordon Cunningham,  (1 May 1887 – 30 January 1983) was a senior officer of the British Army noted for his victories over Italian forces in the East African Campaign during the Second World War. Later he served as the seventh and last High Commissioner of Palestine. He was the younger brother of Admiral of the Fleet Lord Cunningham of Hyndhope.

Early life and military career
Cunningham was born in Dublin, Ireland, the third son of Scottish Professor Daniel John Cunningham and his wife Elizabeth Cumming Browne. He was educated at Cheltenham College and the Royal Military Academy, Woolwich before taking a commission in the Royal Artillery in 1906. During the First World War, he served with the Royal Horse Artillery, and was awarded a Military Cross in 1915 and the Distinguished Service Order in 1918. For two years after the war he served as a staff officer in the Straits Settlements.

After graduating from the Royal Naval College, Greenwich in 1925, followed by the Imperial Defence Studies in 1937, Cunningham became the Commander, Royal Artillery of the 1st Infantry Division. This was followed in 1938 by promotion to major-general and appointment as commander of the 5th Anti-Aircraft Division.

Second World War

After the beginning of the Second World War, Cunningham held a number of short appointments commanding infantry divisions in the United Kingdom (66th Infantry Division, 9th (Highland) Infantry Division, and following its renaming, the 51st (Highland) Infantry Division) before being promoted to lieutenant-general to take command of the East Africa Force in Kenya.

During the East African Campaign General Sir Archibald Wavell, the Commander-in-Chief of the British Middle East Command, directed Cunningham to retake British Somaliland and free Addis Ababa, Ethiopia from the Italians whilst forces under the command of Lieutenant-General Sir William Platt would attack from Sudan in the north through Eritrea. Cunningham's offensive started with the occupation of the Indian Ocean ports of Kismayu and Mogadishu (Italian: Mogadiscio), the Italians having retreated into the interior of Somalia. On 6 April 1941, Cunningham's forces entered Addis Ababa. On 11 May the northernmost units of Cunningham's forces, under South African Brigadier Dan Pienaar linked with Platt's forces under Major-General Mosley Mayne to besiege Amba Alagi. On 20 May, Mayne took the surrender of the Italian Army, led by Amedeo di Savoia, 3rd Duke of Aosta, at Amba Alagi.

His success in East Africa led to Cunningham's appointment to command the new Eighth Army in North Africa in August 1941. His immediate task was to lead General Sir Claude Auchinleck's Libyan Desert offensive which began on 18 November. However, early losses led Cunningham to recommend the offensive be curtailed. This advice was not accepted by his superiors, and Auchinleck relieved him of his command.

He returned to Britain to serve the remainder of the war as Commandant of the Staff College, Camberley (1942) and General Officer C-in-C in Northern Ireland (1943) and Eastern Command (1944). He was appointed a Knight Commander of the Order of the Bath in 1941.

Post-war

After the war, Cunningham, who was promoted to general on 30 October 1945, returned to the Middle East as High Commissioner of Palestine; he served in the position from 1945 to 1948. He was in charge of operations against the Hagana, the Jewish pre-independence defense army as well as the Etzel and Lehi terrorists who in this period fought against the Mandate authorities and the Palestinian population, as well as Palestinian militias, with Arab armies poised to invade as soon as the British withdrew. Cunningham had retired from the army in October 1946 when he relinquished the role of Commander-in-Chief Palestine but retained the job of High Commissioner until 1948. The photo of Cunningham taking down the British flag at the port of Haifa is a historical photo often reproduced in Israeli history textbooks. Cunningham served as Colonel Commandant of the Royal Artillery until 1954. Cunningham died in Royal Tunbridge Wells, Kent, England. He is buried with his father and mother under a simple monument near the Dean Gallery entrance to Dean Cemetery in Edinburgh.

Orders and decorations
 Knight Grand Cross of the Order of St Michael and St George (1948)
 Knight Commander of the Order of the Bath (30 May 1941; Companion 1941)
 Distinguished Service Order (1918)
 Military Cross (1915)
 1914 Star with Clasp
 Mentioned in Despatches (1 January 1916, 18 May 1917 and 20 May 1918; 6 January 1944)
 British War Medal
 Victory Medal
 Order of the Brilliant Star of Zanzibar, 1st class (28 October 1941)
 Commander of the Legion of Merit (United States, 1945)
 Order of the Crown, 1st class (Belgium, 1950)
 Order of Menelik II, 1st class (Ethiopia, 1954)

References

Bibliography

External links

 British Army Officers 1939−1945
 Generals of World War II

|-

|-

|-

|-

|-

|-

|-

|-

|-

1887 births
1983 deaths
British Army generals
Burials at the Dean Cemetery
Graduates of the Royal College of Defence Studies
20th-century Anglo-Irish people
British Army generals of World War II
British Army personnel of World War I
British High Commissioners of Palestine
British military personnel of the Palestine Emergency
British people of Irish descent
British people of Scottish descent
Commandants of the Staff College, Camberley
Commanders of the Legion of Merit
Companions of the Distinguished Service Order
Graduates of the Royal Military Academy, Woolwich
Graduates of the Royal Naval College, Greenwich
Grand Crosses of the Order of the Crown (Belgium)
Irish people of Scottish descent
Knights Commander of the Order of the Bath
Knights Grand Cross of the Order of St Michael and St George
People educated at Cheltenham College
Military personnel from Dublin (city)
Recipients of the Military Cross
Royal Artillery officers
Recipients of orders, decorations, and medals of Ethiopia